Alice Bell is an Australian screenwriter and director. Bell has written for Australian drama, including The Beautiful Lie, The Slap, Spirited, Rush and Puberty Blues. She has directed music videos for artists including Silverchair, Toni Collette and the Finish, Jimmy Barnes, Little Birdy, and Missy Higgins; winning the ARIA Award in 2007 for Best Video, with co-director Paul Goldman, for Silverchair's Straight Lines.

Early life 
Bell grew up in the harbour-side suburb of Balmain, Sydney. After a series of "terrible" jobs, including a stint as a dental nurse and role at an electroplating factory, she chose to forgo formal training and began working in the film industry as production assistant, making her way up to Production Manager at Leah Churchill-Brown's company The Doll Collective.

Career 
In 2006, at age 27, Bell's first feature film, Suburban Mayhem, was invited to screen at Cannes Film Festival. The film then went to the Toronto International Film Festival for its North American premiere before receiving an international release. The screenplay won Bell the AWGIE Award for Best Original Screenplay in 2012, despite it being the first script Bell had ever written. The film however was a critical failure. On Rotten Tomatoes, the film has a "rotten" rating of 20%, based on 5 reviews, with an average rating of 4/10. Bell obsessively researched true crime in order to piece together the story, going so far as attending murder trials to gain insight into crime within families. She completed the script in her early twenties.

Bell was one of the original writers on Channel Ten's police rescue drama, Rush, with her first episode airing 18 November 2008. She wrote episodes for series one to three.

In 2009, Bell completed a five-month intensive writer's workshop at the prestigious Binger Filmlab in Amsterdam, producing screenplay Gin and Tonic, which in 2015 is in its final stages of development.

Bell wrote the Connie episode of ABC's multi-award-winning, critically acclaimed The Slap, the original adaptation of Christos Tsiolkas’ novel of the same name "The Slap's" writing was called "quotidian and naturalistic" by The New York Times. Bell, along with her co-writers, won the 2012 AWGIE Award for Television Mini-Series (Adaptation). Bell received an AWGIE nomination the same year for Best Screenplay in a Television Series for her episode of Spirited, ‘If You See Her Say Hello’. 
In 2013, she was nominated for an AACTA Award with co-writer Tony McNamara for episode five of the Ten Network's Puberty Blues. The show won the AACTA Award for Best Television Drama Series the same year.

Bell is the co-creator, script producer and co-writer of 2015's "The Beautiful Lie" which airs on ABC. She wrote four of the drama's six episodes.

Personal life 
Bell lives in Sydney with her husband - actor, writer and director Leon Ford – and two daughters.

Music videos 
 Look Up - Toni Collette and the Finish (2006)
 Straight Lines - Silverchair (2007)
 Where I Stood - Missy Higgins (2007)
 After Dark - Little Birdy (2007)
 Out in the Blue - Jimmy Barnes (2008)
 by Felisha
 corona virus

References

Australian women writers
Australian writers
Australian television directors
Living people
Year of birth missing (living people)
Australian women television directors